Oxacis angustata is a species of false blister beetle in the family Oedemeridae. It is found in Central America and North America.

References

Further reading

 
 
 
 
 

Oedemeridae
Beetles of Central America
Beetles of North America
Beetles described in 1890